Nupserha nigrolateralis is a species of beetle in the family Cerambycidae. It was described by Stephan von Breuning in 1955. It is known from Vietnam and Laos.

Subspecies
 Nupserha nigrolateralis sericeosuturalis Breuning, 1960
 Nupserha nigrolateralis nigrolateralis Breuning, 1955

References

nigrolateralis
Beetles described in 1955